MV American Cormorant (AK-2062), was a heavy-lift cargo ship built in 1975, that took part in the Gulf War. The ship is named after a genus of cormorant comprising three species found in the Americas, hence the common name American cormorant.

Construction and commissioning 
The ship was built in 1975 by the Eriksbergs Mekaniska Verkstad, Gothenburg, Sweden. She was delivered to be used by Odd Berg & Co. as MV Kollbris in the same year until January 1982.

Kollbris was later sold to Fearnley & Eger and renamed to MV Ferncarrier from 1982 until 1985. During her time in Fearnley & Eger, she was converted from a tanker to a heavy-lift carrier.

In 1985, she was bought by Osprey Ship Management as MV American Cormorant and chartered by the Military Sealift Command (MSC) for the US Army. She was assigned to Marine Prepositioning Squadron 2 and was forward deployed at Diego Garcia. American Cormorant was underway in the Persian Gulf during Operation Desert Storm in 1991.

The contract with MSC was completed in 2002 and she would be returned to commercial service with Osprey until 2014. Sam Woo Holdings Ltd. bought and operated the ship as Asian Atlas. She would be scrapped later.

References

1975 ships
Ships built in Sweden
Heavy lift ships
Cargo ships of the United States Navy
Merchant ships of the United States
Gulf War ships of the United States